Dream House 78' 17"  is a studio album by minimalist composer La Monte Young, artist Marian Zazeela, and their group the Theatre of Eternal Music (featuring trumpetist Jon Hassell and trombonist Garrett List). The album was originally released in 1974 by the French label Shandar. The length of the record, almost double what was then normal, was extremely unusual in its time.

Background
The first composition, "13 I 73 5:35 – 6:14:03 PM NYC" is a part of Map of 49's Dream The Two Systems of Eleven Sets of Galactic Intervals Ornamental Lightyears Tracery, itself a section of an even longer work called The Tortoise, His Dreams and Journeys. In it, three sine waves and the members of the Theatre of Eternal Music play together. According to Young, the lack of harmonic content of the sine waves makes accompanying them with regular instruments and human players extremely difficult.

The second composition, "Drift Study 14 VII 73 9:27:27–10:06:41 PM NYC (39" 14")", is played entirely by sine wave generators. Frequencies and voltages of the sine waves generators were determined and tuned by La Monte Young using oscillators custom-designed by sound engineer Robert Adler to generate specific frequencies and voltages of great stability.

Release
The album was released with the catalog number Shandar 83.510. Regarding the extended run time, Young in the sleeve notes says that "Time is so important to the experiencing and understanding of the music in the record that every effort was made to make the record last as much as the original master tapes"; Young thanked Mr. Michel Blancvillain who made it technically possible.

The cover, labels, design and calligraphy were designed by Marian Zazeela, and are drawn in her trademark magenta on a black background, featuring a picture of her and Young in performance. The two inner sides of the record jacket contain a comment by Shandar founder Daniel Caux, plus extensive original notes penned by La Monte Young himself about the music, its structure and its history. In 2016 Aguirre Records reissued the album on vinyl in a limited-edition, remastered form.

Track listing

Personnel
La Monte Young – voice, sine waves
Marian Zazeela – voice
Jon Hassell – trumpet
Garrett List – trombone

References

External links
 The Dream House
 Mela Foundation
2003 Interview of Zazeela and La Monte Young by Frank Oteri on Dream Houses
Photos of Marian Zazeela light performance for a performance of cellist Charles Curtis

Minimalistic compositions
1974 live albums
1974 compositions
La Monte Young albums
Compositions in just intonation